Marcona may refer to:

 Marcona District, Nazca Province, Peru
 San Juan de Marcona, capital of Marcona District 
 Marcona Mine, an open-pit iron mine in Marcona District
 Marcona, an almond cultivar